Xiaomi Redmi 7A is a smartphone developed by Xiaomi Inc. The smartphone is available in three colour variants — Matte Blue, Matte Gold, and Matte Black. Redmi 7A comes in two storage variants, 2/3 GB RAM and 16/32 GB with 5.45-inch HD+ display. Redmi 7A pricing starts at ₹5,999 for 16 GB And ₹6,199 for 32 GB

Specifications

Hardware 
The Redmi 7A comes with 5.45-inch HD+ (720x1440 pixels) display with an 18:9 aspect ratio. The phone has an octa-core Qualcomm Snapdragon 439 SoC, coupled with 2GB/3GB(non-global version) of RAM and 16GB/32GB of internal storage which is expandable via microSD card.
The phone has a single 12-megapixel Sony IMX486 camera at the back along with an LED flash and PDAF, and a 5MP camera on the front for selfies. Additionally, Redmi 7A has an AI Face Unlock, AI Scene Detection features, and 4000mAh battery with 10W charging support.

Software 
The device runs MIUI 10 based on Android 9 Pie.
It can be updated to MIUI 12.5 based on Android 10.

See also
 Xiaomi Redmi
 Redmi 5

References

External links 

7A
Mobile phones introduced in 2019
Android (operating system) devices
Discontinued smartphones